Augustus F. Gearhard (April 18, 1893 – March 19, 1974) was a brigadier general in the United States Air Force and a Roman Catholic priest.

Gearhard was born in Milwaukee, Wisconsin, in 1893. He would attend St. Francis Seminary and was ordained in 1917. Gearhard died on March 19, 1974.

Military career
Gearhard originally joined the United States Army in 1918 and was deployed overseas to take part in World War I. While serving with the 328th Infantry Regiment of the 82nd Infantry Division, Gearhard was awarded the Distinguished Service Cross, America's second-highest award for combat bravery. He received the medal for valor under fire during the St. Mihiel Offensive in September 1918 and the Meuse-Argonne Offensive the following month. He repeatedly braved artillery and other fire by crossing into no man's land to aid dead and dying soldiers, carrying them to safety.

It was reported that Gearhard was a witness to Sergeant Alvin York's Medal of Honor-earning action on October 8, 1918.

Returning with his division to the US, after post-war occupation duty, in June 1919, Gearhard was honorably discharged from federal service. He returned to Milwaukee to his pre-war post at  St. Michael's Parish. The following year, he moved to become curate at St. Mary's Parish, also in Milwaukee. Then in 1924 he became rector of the Fenwick Home for Boys, also in Milwaukee. He remained here through the inter-war years.

In 1924, Gearhard rejoined the military. He was commissioned an Army Reserve captain in the Chaplain Corps on November 26, 1924. He served in the Army Reserve for the next 17 years, rising to the rank of lieutenant colonel.

Called to active duty in January 1942 during World War II he served with the V Fighter Command, the Fifth Air Force, and finally the Far East Air Force. His service with these formations was all in the Pacific Theater of the war.

In May 1945, Gearhard was one of two chaplains that conducted what was described as “One of the most unusual funeral services of the war." Gearhard and a fellow Army chaplain conducted a funeral service from 11,000 ft in the air. Their plane circled the crash site of the C-47 Skytrain Gremlin Special. They held services by radio relayed to the survivors as they circled the crash site.

Following the war he was named chaplain of the Air Defense Command. Gearhard transferred to the Air Force upon its establishment in 1947. In 1949 he was named chaplain of the United States Air Forces in Europe before becoming Deputy Chief of Chaplains of the Air Force in 1950. He retired from the Air Force in 1953.

Later life and death

After retiring from his combined 30 years of military service, Gearhard returned to Milwaukee. He was pastor of St. Joseph's Parish in Waukesha, Wisconsin, for 18 years. He fully retired in 1971 and died of unknown causes at age 80 in 1974.

Awards and decorations

Awards Gearhard received include the Distinguished Service Cross, the Silver Star, and the Legion of Merit. He was also entitled to several awards for service;

Posthumous honors

In 2019, Gearhard was inducted into the 82nd Airborne Division Hall of Fame. As part of the second group of inductees, Gearhard was the first chaplain so honored.

References

 

Military personnel from Milwaukee
Religious leaders from Milwaukee
United States Air Force generals
United States Air Force chaplains
Recipients of the Distinguished Service Cross (United States)
Recipients of the Silver Star
Recipients of the Legion of Merit
United States Army personnel of World War I
United States Army Air Forces personnel of World War II
World War I chaplains
World War II chaplains
St. Francis Seminary (Wisconsin) alumni
Roman Catholic Archdiocese of Milwaukee
1893 births
1975 deaths
20th-century American Roman Catholic priests